A stacker is a machine used in bulk material handling.

Stacker may also refer to:

 Stacker, disk compression software released by Stac Electronics
 Lempel–Ziv–Stac, also known as "Stacker Compression", a data compression method for point-to-point protocol developed by Stac Electronics
 Stacker 2, a synephrine-based drug for weight loss
 Autoloader (data storage device), alternative name for a device used to automate changing tape cartridges in a magnetic tape drive
 BK Stacker, a type of hamburger sold by Burger King
 Reach stacker, a vehicle for handling intermodal cargo containers
 Stacker (arcade game)

See also
 
 
 Stack (disambiguation)